Cross of Christ Lutheran Church is a historic church in Welch Township, Minnesota, United States, near the city of Red Wing, Minnesota.  It was built in 1878 and was added to the National Register of Historic Places in 1980 as an example of the characteristic steepled churches built in the Swedish American communities of Southeast Minnesota.

References

Churches in Goodhue County, Minnesota
Carpenter Gothic church buildings in Minnesota
Lutheran churches in Minnesota
Churches on the National Register of Historic Places in Minnesota
Churches completed in 1878
National Register of Historic Places in Goodhue County, Minnesota